HMS Antelope was a British  destroyer, which was completed for the Royal Navy in 1930. Antelope served throughout the Second World War, taking part in the sinking of three enemy submarines and in Operation Torch, the Allied invasion of French North Africa.

Construction and design 
Antelope was ordered on 6 March 1928, and was laid down at Hawthorn Leslie on Tyneside on 11 July 1928. The ship was launched on 27 July 1929 and commissioned on 20 March 1930.

She had a main gun armament of four  guns on low angle (30 degree) mounts that were only suitable for anti-ship use, and an anti-aircraft armament of two 2-pounder (40 mm) "pom-poms". Eight  torpedo tubes were fitted on two quadruple mounts, with Mark V torpedoes carried. The initial anti-submarine equipment was limited, with no sonar carried and only six depth charges.

In 1941, one of the 4.7 in guns and the aft bank of torpedo tubes was removed, with a  anti-aircraft gun replacing the torpedo tubes and an enhanced anti-submarine armament, which included 70 depth charges and the ability to drop patterns of 10 charges. Radar was also fitted, and the destroyer's close-in anti-aircraft outfit was supplemented by the addition of Oerlikon 20 mm cannons, of which two were fitted in 1941 followed by four more later on. The 3 inch gun was removed by 1943, when high-frequency direction finding gear was fitted. A second 4.7 in gun was replaced in 1944 by two QF 6-pounder Hotchkiss guns.

History

Prewar operations 
Following completion in 1930, Antelope, along with the rest of the A class and the destroyer leader  joined the 3rd Destroyer Flotilla in the Mediterranean Sea. After repair Antelope returned to the United Kingdom, where she was based at Portsmouth.

Second World War 
On the outbreak of the Second World War, the destroyer was assigned to the 18th Destroyer Flotilla, Channel Force, based at Portsmouth. For the rest of 1939 and the early months of 1940, Antelope carried out patrol and convoy escort duties in the English Channel and Western Approaches. On 5 February 1940, Antelope was the sole escort of the outward bound convoy OA 84 south of Ireland when the German submarine  attacked the convoy, sinking the freighter Beaverburn and damaging the tanker Ceronia. Antelope retaliated, depth-charging and sinking the U-boat. It was the only U-boat at sea at the time in the area and was the first to be sunk underwater by a single destroyer. Antelopes commanding officer, Lieutenant Commander Richard Taylor White R.N. (later Captain R.T. White D.S.O.**, 2nd son of Sir Archibald White, Bt. of Wallingwells) was awarded the Distinguished Service Order (D.S.O.) on 11 July 1940 for good services to the Royal Navy since the outbreak of the war. White was commander of Antelope from 24 September 1938 until 26 February 1941.

Norway 

Atlantic operations 
In August 1940, Antelope sailed in convoy to take part in Operation Menace, the attack on Dakar, but after the cruiser  was torpedoed on 1 September 1940, she escorted her back to the Clyde, Scotland. Antelope then joined the 12th Destroyer Flotilla based at Greenock, Scotland.

Depth charges from Antelope and  drove U-31 to the surface, where her crew abandoned ship. Antelope attempted to board U-31, but collided with the unmanned submarine, damaging the destroyer and sinking U-31. Antelope rescued 44 of the U-31s crew, one of whom died on board, and returned them to the Clyde. Lt. Cdr. White was awarded his first bar to his D.S.O. following this sinking.

Antelope joined the 3rd Destroyer Flotilla, with the job of escorting the capital ships of the Home Fleet. Separated from the battleships during the battle of the Denmark Strait, Antelope searched for survivors from the sinking of Hood, and later was escort to the aircraft carrier .

In August 1941, Antelope took part in Operation Gauntlet, an operation that succeeded in destroying the coaling facilities on Spitsbergen, thus denying the coal to Germans. In October, Antelope formed part of the escort for the Arctic Convoy PQ 1 to the Soviet Union.

Malta 
Antelope sailed to Gibraltar in April 1942, escorting the US aircraft carrier  during Operation Calendar, an attempt to deliver badly needed Spitfire fighter aircraft to Malta.  She acted as an escort during the follow-up Operation Bowery, when carriers  and USS Wasp delivered 61 Spitfires and Operation LB when Eagle delivered a further 17 during May, and Operations Style and Salient in June 1942, when Eagle delivered 55 more Spitfires.

On 11 June, only a day after returning to Gibraltar following Operation Salient, Antelope formed part of the escort for Operation Harpoon, a heavily escorted attempt to resupply Malta. After the cruiser  was damaged by Italian torpedo bombers, Antelope was dispatched from the convoy to tow Liverpool back to Gibraltar, with the destroyer  as escort. In July, Antelope took part in two further Spitfire resupply runs with Eagle, Operations Pinpoint and Insect. In August 1942 Antelope formed part of the main escort force for Operation Pedestal, another Malta convoy.

After a period stationed off West Africa, Antelope escorted troop convoys taking part in Operation Torch, the Allied invasion of French West Africa. On 13 March 1943, she was escorting the ocean liner , when the liner was sunk by the Italian submarine . In July 1943, Antelope took part in Operation Husky, the invasion of Sicily.

Disposal 
In August 1944, Antelope returned to the United Kingdom. By this time she was in poor physical condition, and was paid off into reserve on the Tyne in October to free her crew to help ease a manpower shortage in the Royal Navy. In 1946, she was sold and broken up by Hughes Bolckow shipbreakers.

Notes

Citations

References 
 
 
 
 
 
 
 
 
 
 
 
 
 
 
 

 

A- and B-class destroyers
Ships built on the River Tyne
1929 ships
World War II destroyers of the United Kingdom